Jenny Saléns, established in May 2003, is a dansband from Sweden, scoring successes at the Swedish album chart. Saxophonist Niklas Adamsson won the "Wind musician of the Year" award at the 2007 Guldklaven awards. Later in 2007, Niklas Adamsson was appointed "Cultural Award Winner of the Year " in Hylte Municipality. On 5 January 2008, the live album "Vår egen bröllopsdag", with 15 songs recorded during a dancing event at Mälarsalen in Stockholm in November 2007. The band participated at Dansbandskampen 2008.

Discography

Albums
Vår egen bröllopsdag - 2008
Nu bubblar blodet - 2012
Mot nya mål - 2013
För alltid - 2015

Singles
"Kärlekens låga" - 2003
"Aldrig mer" - 2004
"Tack för kärleken" - 2006
"Vår egen melodi" - 2006
"Lovar du mer" - 2006
"Mot kärlekens land" - 2007
"Handen på hjärtat" - 2007
"The Best" - 2009
"Kom hem" - 2009

Members
Jenny Salén - vocals and accordion
Niklas Adamsson - saxophone, guitar, vocals
Nicklas Mörk - drums
Robert Juth - guitar, vocals

References

External links
Official website
Facebook
YouTube

Musical groups established in 2003
Dansbands
2003 establishments in Sweden